Fenwick Glacier is a glacier,  long, between Mount Majerus and Tūkeri Peak on the headwall of Ringer Valley in the Saint Johns Range of Victoria Land.  It was named by the New Zealand Geographic Board in 2005 after John Fenwick, a Ministry of Works hydrology technician, who led field parties on visits to this area in 1972-73 and 1973–74.

References

Glaciers of Victoria Land